("District Leader") was a Nazi Party political rank and title which existed as a political rank between 1930 and 1945 and as a Nazi Party title from as early as 1928.

Sources 
 Clark, J. (2007). Uniforms of the NSDAP. Atglen, PA: Schiffer Publishing

References 

 
Nazi political ranks